Straža pri Oplotnici is a settlement in the Municipality of Oplotnica in eastern Slovenia. The area is part of the traditional region of Styria. The municipality is now included in the Drava Statistical Region.

Name
The settlement was named Straža until 1998, when it was renamed Straža pri Oplotnici (literally, 'Straža near Oplotnica') to differentiate it from other settlements with the same name. The name Straža is found in various toponyms, oronyms, and hydronyms in Slovenia. It is derived from the common noun straža 'guards, guard post', often referring to a place where watch was kept during the danger of Ottoman attacks.

History
The Roman road from Celeia to Poetovio led through the area, and parts of it are still traceable.

Cultural Heritage
A small chapel with a wooden belfry was built in 1947.

References

External links
Straža pri Oplotnici on Geopedia

Populated places in the Municipality of Oplotnica